Futo-ike Dam  is a rockfill dam located in Kochi Prefecture in Japan. The dam is used for irrigation.  The dam impounds about 1  ha of land when full and can store 20 thousand cubic meters of water. The construction of the dam was completed in 1956.

See also
List of dams in Japan

References

Dams in Kōchi Prefecture